This article refers to the demographics of the U.S. state of Arkansas.

Arkansas is the 32nd largest state, with a population of 2,915,918 as of the 2010 United States Census.

Demographics 

The United States Census Bureau estimates that the population of Arkansas was 2,978,204 on July 1, 2015, a 2.14% increase since the 2010 United States Census

As of 2015, Arkansas had an estimated population of 2,978,204, which is an increase of 11,835, or 0.2%, from the prior year and an increase of 62,286, or 2.14%, since the year 2010. This includes a natural increase since the last census of 52,214 people (that is 198,800 births minus 146,586 deaths) and an increase due to net migration of 57,611 people into the state. Immigration from outside the United States resulted in a net increase of 21,947 people, and migration within the country produced a net increase of 35,664 people. It is estimated that about 48.8% is male, and 51.2% is female. From 2000 through 2006 Arkansas has had a population growth of 5.1% or 137,472. The population density of the state is 51.3 people per square mile.

According to the 2010 United States Census, Arkansas had a population of 2,915,918. The racial composition of the population was:
 77.0% White American
 15.4% Black or African American
 0.8% American Indian and Alaska Native
 1.2% Asian American
 0.2% Native Hawaiian and Other Pacific Islander
 3.4% from Some Other Race
 2.0% from Two or More Races.

6.4% of the population was Hispanic or Latino of any race.

According to the 2006–2008 American Community Survey, the ten largest ancestry groups in the state African American (15.5%), Irish (13.6%), German (12.5%), American (11.1%), English (10.3%), French (2.4%), Scotch-Irish (2.1%), Dutch (1.9%), Scottish (1.9%) and Italian (1.7%).

European Americans have a strong presence in the northwestern Ozarks and the central part of the state. African Americans live mainly in the southern and eastern parts of the state. Arkansans of Irish, English and German ancestry are mostly found in the far northwestern Ozarks near the Missouri border. Ancestors of the Irish in the Ozarks were chiefly Scotch-Irish, Protestants from Northern Ireland, the Scottish lowlands and northern England: part of the largest group of settlers from Great Britain and Ireland before the American Revolution. English and Scotch-Irish immigrants settled throughout the backcountry of the South and in the more mountainous areas. Americans of English ancestry are found throughout the state. There is small community of Roma in Arkansas. Romanichal are present in state. Arkansas also has a growing Hispanic population. Many of the Hispanics in Arkansas are of Mexican descent. Asians are present in the state. There is a Chinese, Hindu and Hmong presence in Arkansas.

Birth data
Note: Births in table don't add up, because Hispanics are counted both by their ethnicity and by their race, giving a higher overall number.

Since 2016, data for births of White Hispanic origin are not collected, but included in one Hispanic group; persons of Hispanic origin may be of any race.

According to the 2006–2008 American Community Survey, 93.8% of Arkansas' population (over the age of five) spoke only English at home. About 4.5% of the state's population spoke Spanish at home. About 0.7% of the state's population spoke any other Indo-European language. About 0.8% of the state's population spoke an Asian language, and 0.2% spoke other languages.

In 2006, Arkansas has a larger percentage of tobacco smokers than the national average, with 24.0% of adults smoking.

Religion 
Arkansas, like most other Southern states, is part of the Bible Belt and is predominantly Protestant. The religious affiliations of the people as of 2001 are as follows:

Christian: 86.0%
Protestant: 78.0%
Baptist: 39.0%
Methodist: 9.0%
Pentecostal: 6.0%
Church of Christ: 6.0%
Assemblies of God: 3.0%
Other Protestant: 15.0%
Roman Catholic: 7.0%
Eastern Orthodox: <1.0%
Other Christian: <1.0%
Non-religious: 14.0%
Other religions: <1.0%
Jewish: <1.0%
Muslim: <1.0%
The largest denominations by number of adherents in 2000 were the Southern Baptist Convention with 665,307; the United Methodist Church with 179,383; the Roman Catholic Church with 115,967; and the American Baptist Association with 115,916.

References

External links 

 
Economy of Arkansas
Arkansas